Funeral Ceremonies is a 1969 Czech drama film directed by Zdenek Sirový based on a novel by Eva Kantůrková. The film was banned after its completion and wasn't released until 1990.

Plot
In winter 1965 recently widowed Matylda Chladilová wants to have her husband buried at the cemetery in his birthplace. To achieve that she needs a permission from the Local committee of the Communist Party, which is headed by an old enemy of her husband Alois Devera. The Chladils were forced to leave their home after an incident that happened in 1951. During the collectivization a Communist Party official Januš forced private farmers in the village to give up their farms for collective farming. Chladil drove Januš away with a rifle and shot at him as he was fleeing. As a result, Chladil's farm was confiscated and the Chladils had to leave to another village to live in poverty. Chladil's funeral is attended by his former neighbours and turns into a silent demonstration against the communist regime.

Cast 
 Jaroslava Tichá as Matylda Chladilová
 Ľudovít Kroner as Jan Chladil
 Josef Somr as Chairman of Local committee Alois Devera
 Jana Vychodilová as Tonka, Devera's wife
 Ludmila Roubíková as Chrudimská, Tonka's mother
 Jan Kühnmund as Chrudimský, Tonka's father
 Gustav Opočenský as Secretary of Local committee Januš
 Božena Böhmová as Anna, Januš's wife
 Josef Bartůněk as Member of parliament

Production
The screenplay was based on the 1967 novel of the same name by Eva Kantůrková. She drew inspiration from the events she witnessed as a teenager. Majority of the movie was shot in Pelhřimov and its neighbouring villages Putimov and Nový Rychnov. After the completion on 24 September 1969 the film was banned and Sirový's directing career was sidelined. During the Normalization he was only allowed to direct pro-regime movies.

Release
The first public screening happened at the Faculty of Philosophy of Charles University in Prague during the Velvet Revolution on 16 November 1989. After the fall of Communism the film could be finally shown in theatres. The premiere was on 1 June 1990. Later that year the movie was screened at the film festivals in Karlovy Vary, Bratislava or Montreal.

Home media
The film was released on VHS by Bonton on March 1, 2003. The same company released the DVD on July 8, 2009.

Reception
Funeral Ceremonies received positive reviews by critics in the Czech Republic. Jaroslav Sedláček called it "one of the great Czech movies of the late 1960s". It won FIPRESCI Award at 1990 Karlovy Vary International Film Festival and Special Jury Prize at 1990 Montreal World Film Festival.

See also
 List of banned films

References

External links
 
 

1969 films
1969 drama films
1960s Czech-language films
Czechoslovak black-and-white films
Czechoslovak drama films
Czech political films
1960s Czech films